Ellamore is an unincorporated community in Randolph and Upshur counties, West Virginia, United States. Ellamore had a post office, which closed on July 11, 2009.

History
The community was named for a lumber baron's wife, Ella Moore.

References

Unincorporated communities in Randolph County, West Virginia
Unincorporated communities in Upshur County, West Virginia
Unincorporated communities in West Virginia